PK-16 Lower Dir-IV is a constituency for the Khyber Pakhtunkhwa Assembly of the Khyber Pakhtunkhwa province of Pakistan.

Elections 2018

Elections 2013
The following table shows the names of candidates, their parties and the votes they secured in the general elections held on May 11, 2013.

Elections 2008
Hidayat Ullah Khan the candidate of Awami National Party won the elections.

Elections 2002
Siraj Ul Haq the candidate of MMA won the elections.

See also
 PK-15 Lower Dir-III
 PK-17 Lower Dir-V

References

Khyber Pakhtunkhwa Assembly constituencies